Roman Kilun (born 27 November 1981) is an American road cyclist, who currently rides for Team Mike's Bikes p/b Equator Coffe.

Major results
2005
 1st Overall Tour of Virginia
 3rd Overall Sea Otter Classic
2008
 1st Stages 2b & 4 
2013
 1st Overall Chico Stage Race
1st Stage 2
 2nd Nevada City Classic
2017
 2nd Overall

References

External links

American male cyclists
1981 births
Living people
Sportspeople from Tashkent
American people of Uzbekistani descent